These hits topped the Dutch Top 40 in 1962.

See also
1962 in music

References

1962 in the Netherlands
1962 record charts
1962